Parapercis ramsayi, the spotted grubfish, is a fish species in the sandperch family, Pinguipedidae. It is found in the Eastern Indian Ocean around southern Western Australia and South Australia.

Etymology
The fish is named almost certainly in honor of zoologist Edward Pierson Ramsay (1842-1916), the Curator of the Australian Museum.

References

May, J.L. and J.G.H. Maxwell, 1986. Trawl fish from temperate waters of Australia. CSIRO Division of Fisheries Research, Tasmania. 492 p.

Pinguipedidae
Taxa named by Franz Steindachner
Fish described in 1883